The Other (translit. El akhar) is a 1999 French-Egyptian drama film directed by Youssef Chahine. It was screened in the Un Certain Regard section at the 1999 Cannes Film Festival. Lebanese soprano Majida El Roumi sang "Adam W Hanan", an Egyptian song included in the film.

Plot 
Love sparks when Adam, back visiting Cairo from University of California, Los Angeles, meets Hanan, native journalist from a smaller town of Egypt in seek of a juicy story to expose the gritty truth about corruption running rampant in the country. A sappy romance between the two youth ensues, and the two quickly get married in the breathtaking deserts of Egypt. Adam's mother, Margaret, very much Americanized and obsessed with Western culture, expresses much displeasure with her son's rash decision to marry a girl such as Hanan, when it would be better to marry a wealthy Western woman,  believing "money is the only thing that binds." Out of an unhealthy attachment with her son, she stalks information on Hanan based on what he told her (something she has done before), and finds that her son's newlywed is related to a terrorist in another conflict-ridden part of the Middle East. Hoping to get Adam to divorce Hanan, she tells him about her findings but it backfires, costing her his trust. Still, Hanan and Adam come to butt heads when he finds out Hanan has been trying to find dirt on the corrupted, wealthy Americans that his father has been in connection with in Cairo, and demands that she stop what she's doing. She remains firm in continuing her work, however, threatening their marriage to fall apart.

Eventually the two make up, and later Adam goes with Hanan to investigate what is happening with her exiled brother (who turns out to be the terrorist). The two get caught up in a terrorist shoot out, and die violently hand in hand.

Cast
 Nabila Ebeid as Margaret
 Mahmoud Hemida as Khalil
 Hanan Tork as Hanane (as Hanane Turk)
 Hani Salama as Adam
 Lebleba as Baheyya
 Hassan Abdel Hamid as Dr. Maher
 Ezzat Abou Aouf as Dr. Essam
 Ahmed Fouad Selim as Ahmed
 Amr Saad as Omar
 Ahmed Wafik as Fathallab
 Edward Said as himself
 Hamdeen Sabahi as Chief editor
 Tamer Samir as Morcy

References

External links

1999 films
1990s Arabic-language films
1999 drama films
Films directed by Youssef Chahine
Egyptian drama films
French drama films
1999 multilingual films
Egyptian multilingual films
French multilingual films
1990s French films